Yedo Fiúza (15 September 1894 – 12 February 1975) was a Brazilian politician. He served as mayor of Petrópolis. He contested the 1945 presidential election as an antimilitarist independent, with the support of the Brazilian Communist Party (PCB). Fiúza surprised political analysts by polling half a million votes.

References

1894 births
People from Porto Alegre
Mayors of places in Brazil
Candidates for President of Brazil
Brazilian Communist Party politicians
Brazilian Socialist Party politicians
1975 deaths